Key type stamps are stamps of a uniform design that were widely used by colonial territories in the 19th and 20th centuries.

Origins 
The idea was invented by Perkins Bacon who used it to print stamps for Trinidad (1851), Barbados (1852) and Mauritius (1858), all featuring the same Britannia design.

Key plate stamps 
The idea was refined by De La Rue in 1879 when the printing process was split into two through the use of a key plate (or head plate) for the bulk of the design and a separate duty plate for the name of the colony and the value. These are often known as key plate stamps. While key type stamps are always of one colour, key plate stamps are bi-coloured. This method has the advantage that most of the design remains the same in each of a stamp series with only the value, name and colours changing.

Key plate stamps were used extensively by Great Britain, Germany, France, Spain and Portugal.

Revenues 
Key plates were also a ubiquitous feature of revenue stamps of Burma/Myanmar, Great Britain, India, Ireland, Malta and Pakistan. These had a tablet at the bottom, and this was appropriated (overprinted to indicate the type of use), e.g. Consular Service, Contract Note, Notarial, Special Adhesive, Stocks & Shares. Malta was the only country to also issue unappropriated stamps (with the bottom tablet still blank).

See also 
Navigation and Commerce issue
Omnibus issue
Yacht issue

References

Further reading 
Fernbank, Peter E. King George V Key Plates of the Imperium Postage and Revenue Design. Banbury: West Africa Study Circle, 1997. 
Lowe, Robson. The De La Rue Key Plates, London: 1979.
Yendall, Eric. King George VI Large Key Type Revenue and Postage High Value Stamps 1937-1953. London: Royal Philatelic Society, 2008.

Philatelic terminology
Postage stamps